The Whitlam government was the federal executive government of Australia led by Prime Minister Gough Whitlam of the Australian Labor Party. The government commenced when Labor defeated the McMahon Government at the 1972 federal election, ending a record 23 years of continuous Coalition government. It was terminated by Governor-General Sir John Kerr following the 1975 constitutional crisis and was succeeded by the Fraser Government—the sole occasion  in Australian history when an elected federal government was dismissed by the head of state.

The Whitlam government was highly controversial during its short tenure but achieved some major reforms. Formal relations with China were established, conscription laws were repealed, all remaining Australian forces were withdrawn from the Vietnam War, universal healthcare was introduced and some remaining discriminatory provisions of the White Australia policy were abolished. Tertiary education fees were abolished for a period. However, these and other enthusiastic reforms corresponded to a crisis: "By mid-1975, inflation hit 17.6 per cent and wage rises hit 32.9 per cent. The economy boomed in 1973 and the first half of '74, but then suffered a severe recession." The Whitlam government was re-elected for a second term at the 1974 double-dissolution election but, following the dismissal, was heavily defeated by the new Fraser Government in the 1975 election.

Background
The Australian Labor Party had entered opposition in 1949, following the loss of the Chifley Government to the Robert Menzies-led Liberal-Country Party Coalition. The Coalition then governed continuously for 23 years. Gough Whitlam became deputy leader of the Labor Party in 1960, and Arthur Calwell subsequently retired as leader in 1967 following Labor's poor result in the 1966 election. Whitlam was elected party leader in April 1967, with Lance Barnard as deputy leader. Labor reduced the Gorton Government's majority and came within 4 seats of government in the 1969 election. Whitlam then led the Labor Party to victory against the McMahon Government at the 1972 election.

First term

Duumvirate
Whitlam took office with a majority in the House of Representatives, but without control of the Senate (elected in 1967 and 1970). The Senate at that time consisted of ten members from each of the six states, elected by proportional representation. The ALP parliamentary caucus chose the ministers, but Whitlam was allowed to assign portfolios. A caucus meeting could not be held until after the final results came in on 15 December. In the meantime, it was expected that McMahon would remain caretaker prime minister. Whitlam, however, was unwilling to wait that long. On 5 December, once Labor's win was secure, Whitlam had the Governor-General, Sir Paul Hasluck, swear him in as prime minister and Labor's deputy leader, Lance Barnard, as deputy prime minister. The two men held 27 portfolios between them during the two weeks before a full cabinet could be determined.

During the two weeks the so-called "duumvirate" held office, Whitlam sought to fulfill those campaign promises that did not require legislation. Whitlam ordered negotiations to establish full relations with the People's Republic of China, and broke those with Taiwan. Legislation allowed the Minister for Defence to grant exemptions from conscription. Barnard held this office, and exempted everyone. Seven men were at that time incarcerated for refusing conscription; Whitlam arranged for their freedom. The Whitlam government in its first days re-opened the equal pay case pending before the Commonwealth Conciliation and Arbitration Commission led by Sydney barrister Mary Gaudron, and appointed a woman, Elizabeth Evatt, as presidential member of the commission. Whitlam and Barnard eliminated sales tax on contraceptive pills, announced major grants for the arts, and appointed an interim schools commission. The duumvirate barred racially discriminatory sport teams from Australia, and instructed the Australian delegation at the United Nations to vote in favour of sanctions on apartheid South Africa and Rhodesia. It also ordered home all remaining Australian troops in Vietnam, though most (including all conscripts) had been withdrawn by McMahon.

According to Whitlam speechwriter Graham Freudenberg, the duumvirate was a success, as it showed that the Labor government could manipulate the machinery of government, despite its long absence from office. However, Freudenberg noted that the rapid pace and public excitement caused by the duumvirate's actions caused the Opposition to be wary of giving Labor too easy a time, and led to one post mortem verdict on the Whitlam government, "We did too much too soon."

Enacting an agenda
The McMahon government had consisted of 27 ministers, twelve of whom comprised the Cabinet. In the run-up to the election, the Labor caucus had decided that should the party take power, all 27 ministers were to be Cabinet members. Intense canvassing took place amongst ALP parliamentarians as the duumvirate did its work, and on 18 December the caucus elected the Cabinet. The results were generally acceptable to Whitlam, and within three hours, he had announced the portfolios of the cabinet members. To give himself greater control over the Cabinet, in January 1973 Whitlam established five cabinet committees (with the members appointed by himself, not the caucus) and took full control of the cabinet agenda.

The Whitlam government abolished the death penalty for federal crimes. Legal Aid was established, with offices in each state capital. It abolished tertiary school (university) fees, and established the Schools Commission to allocate funds to schools. Whitlam founded the Department of Urban Development and, having lived in developing Cabramatta when it was largely unsewered, set a goal to leave no urban home unsewered.

The new government gave grants directly to local government units for urban renewal, flood prevention, and the promotion of tourism. Other federal grants financed highways linking the state capitals, and paid for standard-gauge rail lines between the states. The government created a new city at Albury-Wodonga on the New South Wales-Victoria border. "Advance Australia Fair" became the country's national anthem, in preference to "God Save the Queen". The Order of Australia replaced the British honours system in early 1975.

Whitlam was a vocal advocate for Indigenous rights. His government created the Aboriginal Land Fund to help Indigenous groups buy back privately owned lands. The Aboriginal Loans Commission was initiated to assist Indigenous Australians with the purchase of property with a view to home ownership, as well as to help establish Indigenous-owned businesses and pay for health and education expenses,.

In 1973, the National Gallery of Australia, then called the Australian National Gallery, bought the painting Blue Poles by 20th-century artist Jackson Pollock for US$2 million (A$1.3 million at the time of payment)—about a third of its annual budget. This required Whitlam's personal permission, which he gave on the condition the price was publicised. In the conservative climate of the time, the purchase created a political and media scandal, and was said to symbolise either Whitlam's foresight and vision, or his profligate spending.

Whitlam travelled extensively as prime minister, and was the first Australian prime minister to visit China while in office. He was criticised for this travel, especially after Cyclone Tracy struck Darwin; he interrupted an extensive tour of Europe for 48 hours (deemed too brief a period by many) to view the devastation.

Early troubles

In February 1973, the Attorney-General, Senator Lionel Murphy, led a police raid on the Melbourne office of the Australian Security Intelligence Organisation, which was under his ministerial responsibility. Murphy believed that ASIO might have files relating to domestic Croatian terrorist threats against Yugoslav Prime Minister Džemal Bijedić, who was about to visit Australia, and feared ASIO might conceal or destroy them. The Opposition attacked the Government over the raid, terming Murphy a "loose cannon". A Senate investigation of the incident was cut short when Parliament dissolved in 1974. According to journalist and author Wallace Brown, the controversy over the raid continued to dog the Whitlam government throughout its term because the incident was "so silly".

From the start of the Whitlam government, the Opposition, led by Billy Snedden (who replaced McMahon as Liberal leader in December 1972) sought to use control of the Senate to baulk Whitlam. It did not seek to block all government legislation; the Coalition senators, led by Senate Liberal leader Reg Withers, sought to block government legislation only when the obstruction would advance the Opposition's agenda. The Whitlam government also had numerous problems and issues in relations with the states. New South Wales refused the government's request that it close the Rhodesian Information Centre in Sydney. The Queensland premier, Joh Bjelke-Petersen, refused to consider any adjustment in Queensland's border with Papua New Guinea, which, due to the state's ownership of islands in the Torres Strait, came within half a kilometre (about one-third of a mile) of the Papuan mainland. Liberal state governments in New South Wales and Victoria were re-elected by large margins in 1973. Whitlam and his majority in the House of Representatives proposed a constitutional referendum in December 1973, transferring control of wages and prices from the states to the Federal government. The two propositions failed to attract a majority of voters in any state, and were rejected by over 800,000 votes nationwide.

Labor had come to office during a period of improvement for Australia's economic outlook, with rural industries performing well, unemployment falling, production increasing and a boom in foreign investment and exports. Nevertheless, signs of increasing inflation and slow private business investment portended looming economic troubles, leading to the 1973–75 recession and the 1973 oil crisis. According to political historian Brian Carroll, the Whitlam government chose in its 1973–4 budget to "put major emphasis on the Party's social objectives rather than on moderating the obvious expansionary trends in the economy" and the budget substantially increased direct government spending and increased redistribution of income through welfare.

By early 1974, the Senate had rejected nineteen government bills, ten of them twice. With a half-Senate election due by midyear, Whitlam looked for ways to shore up support in that body. Queensland Senator and former DLP leader Vince Gair signalled his willingness to leave the Senate for a diplomatic post. With five Queensland seats at stake in the half-Senate election, the ALP would probably win only two, but if six were at stake, the party would most likely win three. Possible control of the Senate was therefore at stake; Whitlam agreed to Gair's request and had the Governor-General Sir Paul Hasluck appoint him Ambassador to Ireland. Word leaked of Gair's pending resignation, and Whitlam's opponents attempted to counteract his manoeuvre. On what became known as the "Night of the Long Prawns", Country Party members entertained Gair at a small party in the office of Senator Ron Maunsell, to delay him visiting the Senate President to tender his resignation. As Gair enjoyed beer and prawns, Bjelke-Petersen advised the Queensland Governor, Sir Colin Hannah, to issue writs for only the usual five vacancies, since Gair's seat was not yet vacant, effectively countering Whitlam's plan.

With the Opposition threatening to disrupt supply, or block the appropriation bills, Whitlam used the Senate's defeat of several bills twice to trigger a double dissolution election, holding it instead of the half-Senate election it had already announced. After a campaign featuring the Labor slogan "Give Gough a fair go", the Whitlam government was returned, with its majority in the House of Representatives cut from seven to five. Both Government and Opposition secured 29 seats in the Senate, with the balance of power held by two independents. The deadlock over the twice-rejected bills was broken, uniquely in Australian history, with a special joint sitting of the two houses of Parliament under Section 57 of the Constitution. This session, authorised by the new Governor-General, Sir John Kerr, passed bills providing for universal health insurance (known then as Medibank, today as Medicare) and providing the Northern Territory and Australian Capital Territory with representation in the Senate, effective at the next election.

Second term

1974
By mid-1974, Australia was in an economic slump. The 1973 oil crisis had caused prices to spike and, according to government figures, inflation topped 13 percent for over a year between 1973 and 1974. Part of the inflation was due to Whitlam's desire to increase wages and conditions of the Commonwealth Public Service as a pacesetter for the private sector. The Whitlam government had cut tariffs by 25 percent in 1973; 1974 saw an increase in imports of 30 percent and a $1.5 billion increase in the trade deficit. Primary producers of commodities such as beef were caught in a credit squeeze as short-term rates rose to extremely high levels. Unemployment also rose significantly. Unease within the ALP led to Barnard's defeat when Jim Cairns challenged him for his deputy leadership. Whitlam gave little help to his embattled deputy, who had formed the other half of the duumvirate.

Again, in the 1974–75 budget, the government emphasised its social objectives, with Treasurer Frank Crean saying that its "overriding objective is to get on with various initiatives in the fields of education, health, social welfare and urban improvements". According to Carroll, most economic observers agreed "there was little in the budget likely to arrest what they saw as the alarming drift in the economic climate". By 1974, inflation had worsened and Australia had entered the 1973–75 recession and suffered through the 1973 oil crisis. Unemployment reached 5% (at that time considered high).

Despite these economic indicators, the budget presented in August 1974 saw large increases in spending, especially in education. Treasury officials had advised a series of tax and fee increases, ranging from excise taxes to the cost of posting a letter; their advice was mostly rejected by Cabinet. The budget was unsuccessful in dealing with the inflation and unemployment, and Whitlam introduced large tax cuts in November. He also announced additional spending to help the private sector.

In August, the government launched the Royal Commission on Intelligence and Security, led by Justice Robert Marsden Hope, to investigate the Australian Intelligence Community and, especially, the Australian Security Intelligence Organisation.

Following the 1974–75 budget, Whitlam removed Frank Crean as Treasurer, replacing him with deputy prime minister Jim Cairns. Cairns's reputation took an early blow with media coverage of the appointment of Junie Morosi as his private secretary, a woman with no prior treasury or public service experience, and with whom he engaged in an extramarital affair. Cairns then misled parliament over the Loans Affair and was in turn replaced by Bill Hayden before having a chance to bring down his first budget. According to Brian Carroll, Hayden "presented a budget more in keeping with the established notion that it was an instrument of economic management rather than of social reform", however by the time Hayden reached the Treasury portfolio "the Whitlam government's political troubles were beginning to overtake it".

Final months

Whitlam appointed Senator Murphy to the High Court, even though Murphy's Senate seat would not be up for election if a half-Senate election were held. Labor then held three of the five short-term New South Wales Senate seats. Under proportional representation, Labor could hold its three short term seats in the next half-Senate election, but if Murphy's seat were also contested, Labor was unlikely to win four out of six. Thus, a Murphy appointment meant the almost certain loss of a seat in the closely divided Senate at the next election. Whitlam appointed Murphy anyway. By convention, senators appointed by the state legislature to fill casual vacancies were from the same political party as the former senator. The New South Wales premier, Tom Lewis felt that this convention only applied to vacancies caused by deaths or ill-health, and arranged for the legislature to elect Cleaver Bunton, former mayor of Albury and an independent.

By March 1975, many Liberal parliamentarians felt that Snedden was doing an inadequate job as Leader of the Opposition, and that Whitlam was dominating him in the House of Representatives. Malcolm Fraser challenged Snedden for the leadership, and defeated him on 21 March.

Soon after Fraser's accession, controversy arose over the Whitlam government's actions in trying to restart peace talks in Vietnam. As the North prepared to end the civil war, Whitlam sent cables to both Vietnamese governments, telling Parliament that both cables were substantially the same. The Opposition contended he had misled Parliament, and a motion to censure Whitlam was defeated along party lines. The Opposition also attacked Whitlam for not allowing enough South Vietnamese refugees into Australia, with Fraser calling for the entry of 50,000. Freudenberg alleges that 1,026 Vietnamese refugees entered Australia in the final eight months of the Whitlam government, and only 399 in 1976 under Fraser. However, by 1977, Australia had accepted over five thousand refugees.

As the political situation deteriorated, Whitlam and his government continued to enact legislation: The Family Law Act 1975 provided for no-fault divorce while the Racial Discrimination Act 1975 caused Australia to ratify United Nations conventions against racial discrimination that Australia had signed under Holt, but which had never been ratified. In August 1975, Whitlam gave the Gurindji people of the Northern Territory title deeds to part of their traditional lands, beginning the process of Aboriginal land reform. The next month, Australia granted independence to Papua New Guinea.

Following the 1974 Carnation Revolution, Portugal began a process of decolonisation and began a withdrawal from Portuguese Timor (later East Timor). Australians had long taken an interest in the colony; the nation had sent troops to the region during World War II, and many East Timorese had fought the Japanese as guerrillas. In September 1974, Whitlam met with Indonesian President, Suharto, in Indonesia and indicated that he would support Indonesia if it annexed East Timor. At the height of the Cold War and with American retreat from Indo-China, he felt that if incorporated into Indonesia, the region would be more stable, and Australia would not risk having the East Timorese FRETILIN movement, which many feared was communist, come to power. Whitlam says that he forcefully told Indonesian President Suharto that the East Timorese were entitled to decide the colony's fate through self-determination. Indonesia invaded East Timor in December 1975, and occupied it until the 1999 vote for independence.

Whitlam had offered Barnard a diplomatic post; in early 1975 Barnard agreed to this, triggering the 1975 Bass by-election in his Tasmanian electorate. The election on 28 June proved a disaster for Labor, which lost the seat with a swing against it of 17 percent. The next week, Whitlam fired Barnard's successor as deputy prime minister, Cairns, who had misled Parliament regarding the Loans Affair amid innuendo about his relationship with his office manager, Junie Morosi. At the time of Cairns' dismissal, one Senate seat was vacant, following the death on 30 June of Queensland ALP Senator Bertie Milliner. The state Labor party nominated Mal Colston, resulting in a deadlock. The unicameral Queensland legislature twice voted against Colston, and the party refused to submit any alternative candidates. Bjelke-Petersen finally convinced the legislature to elect a low-level union official, Albert Field, who had contacted his office and expressed a willingness to serve. In interviews, Field made it clear he would not support Whitlam. Field was expelled from the ALP for standing against Colston, and Labor senators boycotted his swearing-in. Whitlam argued that, because of the manner of filling vacancies, the Senate was "corrupted" and "tainted", with the Opposition enjoying a majority they did not win at the ballot box.

Loans Affair

Minerals and Energy Minister Rex Connor wanted funds for a series of national development projects. He proposed that to finance his plans, the government should borrow $US 4 billion (at that time a huge sum of money). It was a requirement of the Australian Constitution that non-temporary government borrowings must be through the Loan Council. Although the development projects were long-term, Whitlam, together with ministers Cairns, Murphy and Connor authorised Connor to seek the loan on 13 December 1974, without involving the Loan Council. Connor had already been investigating the loan. Through an Adelaide builder, he had been introduced to Pakistani dealer Tirath Khemlani. According to Khemlani, Connor asked for a 20-year loan with interest at 7.7% and set a commission to Khemlani of 2.5%. Despite assurance that all was in order, Khemlani began to stall on the loan, notably after he was asked to go to Zurich with officials of the Reserve Bank of Australia to prove that the funds were in the Union Bank of Switzerland as he had claimed. The government revised its authority to Connor to $2 billion.

As news leaked of the plan, the Opposition began questioning the Government. Under questioning from Fraser, Whitlam said on 20 May that the loans pertained to "matters of energy", that the Loans Council had not been advised, and that it would be advised only "if and when the loan is made". The following day he told Fraser and Parliament that authority for the plan had been revoked. On 4 June 1975, the Treasurer and deputy prime minister, Jim Cairns, misled Parliament by claiming that he had not given a letter to an intermediary offering a 2.5% commission on a loan. Whitlam removed Cairns from Treasury and made him Minister for the environment, before dismissing him from Cabinet.

While the Loans Affair never resulted in an actual loan, according to author and Whitlam speechwriter Graham Freudenberg, "The only cost involved was the cost to the reputation of the Government. That cost was to be immense—it was government itself."

The Affair ultimately gave new Liberal leader Malcolm Fraser the perceived justification he needed to block supply of budget Bills in the Senate, with the aim of forcing Whitlam to an election.

Constitutional crisis

In October 1975, the Opposition, led by Fraser, determined to block supply by deferring consideration of appropriation bills. With Field on leave (his Senate appointment having been challenged), the Coalition had an effective majority of 30–29 in the Senate. The Coalition believed that if Whitlam could not deliver supply, and would not advise new elections, Kerr would have to dismiss him. Supply would run out on 30 November.

The stakes were raised in the conflict on 10 October, when the High Court declared valid the Act granting the territories two senators each. In a half-Senate election, most successful candidates would not take their places until 1 July 1976, but the territorial senators, and those filling Field's and Bunton's seats, would assume their seats at once. This gave Labor an outside chance of controlling the Senate, at least up until 1 July 1976. On 14 October, Labor minister Rex Connor, mastermind of the loans scheme, was forced to resign when Khemlani released documents showing that Connor had made misleading statements. The continuing scandal confirmed the Coalition in their stance that they would not concede supply. Whitlam on the other hand, convinced that he would win the battle, was glad of the distraction from the Loans Affair, and believed that he would "smash" not only the Senate, but Fraser's leadership as well.

Whitlam told the House of Representatives on 21 October,
Whitlam and his ministers repeatedly warned that the Opposition was damaging not only the Constitution, but Australia's economic position as well. The Coalition senators tried to remain united, as several became increasingly concerned about the tactic of blocking supply. As the crisis dragged into November, Whitlam attempted to make arrangements for public servants and suppliers to be able to cash cheques at banks. These transactions would be temporary loans which the government would repay once supply was restored.

Governor-General Kerr was following the crisis closely. At a luncheon with Whitlam and several of his ministers on 30 October, Kerr suggested a compromise: if Fraser conceded supply, Whitlam would agree not to call the half-Senate election until May or June 1976, or alternatively would agree not to call the Senate into session until after 1 July. Whitlam rejected the idea, seeking to end the Senate's right to deny supply. On 3 November, after a meeting with Kerr, Fraser proposed that if the government agreed to hold a House of Representatives election at the same time as the half-Senate election, the Coalition would concede supply. Whitlam rejected this offer, stating that he had no intention of advising a House election for at least a year.

With the crisis unresolved, on 6 November, Kerr decided to dismiss Whitlam as prime minister. Fearing that Whitlam would go to the Queen and have him removed, Kerr did not give Whitlam any hint of what was coming. He conferred (against Whitlam's advice) with High Court Chief Justice Sir Garfield Barwick, who agreed that he had the power to dismiss Whitlam.

A meeting among the party leaders, including Whitlam and Fraser, to resolve the crisis on the morning of 11 November came to nothing. Kerr and Whitlam met at the Governor-General's office that afternoon at 1.00 pm. Unknown to Whitlam, Fraser was waiting in an ante-room; Whitlam later stated that he would not have set foot in the building if he had known Fraser was there. Whitlam, as he had told Kerr by phone earlier that day, came prepared to advise a half-Senate election, to be held on 13 December. Kerr instead told Whitlam that he had terminated his commission as prime minister, and handed him a letter to that effect. After the conversation, Whitlam returned to the prime minister's residence, The Lodge, had lunch and conferred with his advisers. Immediately after his meeting with Whitlam, Kerr commissioned Fraser as caretaker prime minister, on the assurance he could obtain supply and would then advise Kerr to dissolve both houses for election.

In the confusion, Whitlam and his advisers did not immediately tell any Senate members of the dismissal, with the result that when the Senate convened at 2.00 pm, the appropriation bills were rapidly passed, with the ALP senators assuming the Opposition had given in. The bills were soon sent to Kerr to receive Royal Assent. At 2.34 pm, ten minutes after supply had been secured, Fraser rose in the House and announced he was prime minister. He promptly suffered a series of defeats in the House, which instructed the Speaker, Gordon Scholes, to advise Kerr to reinstate Whitlam.

By the time Kerr received Scholes, Parliament had been dissolved by proclamation. Kerr's Official Secretary, David Smith came to Parliament House to proclaim the dissolution from the front steps. A large, angry crowd had gathered, and Smith was nearly drowned out by their noise. He concluded with the traditional "God save the Queen". Former Prime Minister Whitlam, who had been standing behind Smith, then addressed the crowd:Well may we say "God save the Queen", because nothing will save the Governor-General! The Proclamation which you have just heard read by the Governor-General's Official Secretary was countersigned Malcolm Fraser, who will undoubtedly go down in Australian history from Remembrance Day 1975 as Kerr's cur. They won't silence the outskirts of Parliament House, even if the inside has been silenced for a few weeks... Maintain your rage and enthusiasm for the campaign for the election now to be held and until polling day.

See also
 First Whitlam Ministry
 Second Whitlam Ministry
 Third Whitlam Ministry

References

Bibliography

 
 
 
 
 
 
 
 
 
 

1972 establishments in Australia
1975 disestablishments in Australia
Whitlam
Australian Labor Party governments
Gough Whitlam
History of Australia (1945–present)